The Boss Baby: Family Business (known in other territories as The Boss Baby 2) is a 2021 American computer-animated comedy film loosely based on the 2010 picture book The Boss Baby and its 2016 sequel The Bossier Baby by Marla Frazee. Produced by DreamWorks Animation and distributed by Universal Pictures, it is the second installment in The Boss Baby franchise and the sequel to the 2017 film. The film was directed by Tom McGrath from a screenplay by Michael McCullers and a story by McGrath and McCullers. The film stars the voices of Alec Baldwin, James Marsden, Amy Sedaris, Ariana Greenblatt, Jeff Goldblum, Eva Longoria, Jimmy Kimmel, and Lisa Kudrow.

The plot follows the now-adult Templeton brothers who are brought back together after Tim's daughter Tina requests their help for Baby Corp to stop a professor from erasing childhoods worldwide. Plans for a Boss Baby sequel were announced in May 2017 with McGrath returning to direct. Animation began at DWA Glendale and some production assets were borrowed from Jellyfish Pictures, with voice acting being done remotely due to the COVID-19 pandemic.

The film was theatrically released in the United States on July 2, 2021 in traditional and select RealD 3D, Dolby Cinema and 4DX locations, by Universal Pictures; it also streamed on paid tiers of Peacock for 60 days. The film grossed $146 million worldwide, and received generally mixed reviews from critics, with the Rotten Tomatoes critics consensus calling it "a painless diversion for the kids".

Plot 

Tim Templeton is now an adult and lives with his wife Carol and their two daughters, 7-year-old Tabitha and infant Tina. Tim's younger brother Ted is a successful CEO and is always absent. One night, Tim discovers that Tina is from Baby Corp, just as Ted once was, and that she has been assigned for a "special mission" that requires Ted's presence. Tim refuses to call Ted, saying that he will never come. However, Tina leaves a fake voicemail for Ted, luring him to the Templetons' house.

The next morning, Ted arrives and Tim explains to him that Tina is a Baby Corp dispatch. Tina introduces the brothers to a new formula that will allow them to turn back into children for 48 hours in order to infiltrate Tabitha's school and figure out what Dr. Erwin Armstrong, founder and principal of the Acorn Center for Advanced Childhood is planning behind parents' backs.

At the school, Tim, now as his 7-year-old self, follows Tabitha to her class while baby Ted is placed with other babies. Ted rallies the babies to help him get out of the playroom so that he can go to Armstrong's office to investigate. Tim tries to get sent to the principal's office by disrupting class, but is instead put in "The Box" for timeout. Ted discovers that Armstrong is actually a baby himself, having run away from home after realizing that he was smarter than his parents and now makes money by creating popular phone apps. His ultimate plan is to get rid of every parent on B-Day, so that they cannot tell their children what to do anymore.

On the night of the holiday pageant, where Tabitha is supposed to sing a solo, the brothers and Tina plan to expose Armstrong. However, they learn that B-Day is set to happen that night through Armstrong's new app, QT-Snap, which will hypnotize the parents into mindless zombies. Both Tim and Ted are caught by Armstrong's ninja babies and are put in The Box, which slowly starts to fill with water. Tabitha performs her solo, but when she sees that Tim has not shown up, she runs off the stage crying. She is consoled by Tina, who reveals her identity and her mission. Tabitha agrees to help her younger sister by getting to the server and shutting down QT-Snap before it can go worldwide. Ted calls Precious, Tabitha's pet pony, into the school, to break them out of The Box.

Tim and Ted reach the server first, but they are stopped by Armstrong, who calls the zombie parents for backup. While the brothers hold them back as the formula starts to wear off, Tina and Tabitha get up to the server. Tabitha is able to hack in and pull up the shutdown screen, but is interrupted by Armstrong. The sisters then set off a candy lava volcano using Mentos and soda, destroying the servers and turning all parents back to normal. Tina then reveals that bringing Tim and Ted back together was her true mission. The whole Templeton family gathers to celebrate Christmas, while Armstrong returns to his own family.

Voice cast 
 Alec Baldwin as Ted Templeton Jr. / The Boss Baby, a former executive of Baby Corp, Tim's younger brother, Tina and Tabitha's uncle, Carol's brother-in-law, and Ted Sr. and Janice's younger son
 James Marsden as Tim Templeton, Ted Jr.'s older brother, Carol's husband, Tina and Tabitha's father, and Ted Sr. and Janice's older son. Marsden replaces Tobey Maguire and Miles Bakshi from the first film, where Maguire voiced the adult Tim and Bakshi voiced the younger Tim
 Amy Sedaris as Tina Templeton, an undercover and new executive of Baby Corp, Tim and Carol's younger daughter, Tabitha's younger sister, Ted's younger niece, and Ted Sr. and Janice's younger granddaughter
 Ariana Greenblatt as Tabitha Templeton, Tina's older sister, Tim and Carol's highly intelligent older daughter, Ted's older niece, and Ted Sr. and Janice's older granddaughter. Greenblatt replaces Nina Zoe Bakshi from the first film
 Jeff Goldblum as Dr. Erwin Armstrong, an intelligent baby with a plot to remove all grownups
 Eva Longoria as Carol Templeton, Tim's wife, Ted Jr.'s sister-in-law, Ted Sr. and Janice's daughter-in-law, and Tina and Tabitha's mother
 Jimmy Kimmel as Ted Templeton Sr., Janice's husband, Ted Jr. and Tim's father, Carol's father-in-law, and Tina and Tabitha's paternal grandfather
 Lisa Kudrow as Janice Templeton, Ted Sr.'s wife, Ted Jr. and Tim's mother, Carol's mother-in-law, and Tina and Tabitha's paternal grandmother
 James McGrath as Wizzie, Tim's Gandalf-esque alarm clock from his childhood

Production

Development 
On May 25, 2017, Universal Pictures and DreamWorks Animation announced that a sequel was set to be released on March 26, 2021, with Alec Baldwin reprising his role. On May 17, 2019, it was announced that Tom McGrath returned as director and Jeff Hermann, whose credits include Bilby, Bird Karma, and Marooned, replaced Ramsey Ann Naito as producer. On September 17, 2020, Jeff Goldblum, Ariana Greenblatt, Eva Longoria, James Marsden (replacing Tobey Maguire), and Amy Sedaris joined the cast, alongside returning actors Jimmy Kimmel and Lisa Kudrow.

Animation
Portions of production were done remotely during the COVID-19 pandemic. While the animation for the film was done at DWA Glendale, Jellyfish Pictures, who worked on How to Train Your Dragon: Homecoming and Spirit Untamed, used its production assets for Family Business.

Music 
Hans Zimmer and Steve Mazzaro, who previously composed the score for the first film, returned for the sequel, while Jacob Collier wrote a cover of Cat Stevens' "If You Want to Sing Out, Sing Out". Songwriter Gary Barlow also contributed with a brand new song performed by Greenblatt called "Together We Stand". Other tracks from Hans Zimmer such as "Run Free" from Spirit: Stallion of the Cimarron and "Zoosters Breakout" from Madagascar were used in the film with the "Run Free" track used during the pony chase to Acorn Academy at a theater Tim and Ted break into. The "Global Warming Song" in the third act of the film was written by Zimmer and Marazzo, along with Tom McGrath and Nelson Yokota, and produced by Marazzo.

Release 
The Boss Baby: Family Business was theatrically released in the United States on July 2, 2021, in regular showings and in select RealD 3D Dolby Cinema and 4DX by Universal Pictures; it also streamed on paid tiers of Peacock for 60 days. It was originally scheduled for release on March 26, 2021, but was delayed to September 17, 2021 due to the COVID-19 pandemic, before moving to July 2, 2021.

According to Samba TV, 783,000 households streamed the film on Peacock over its opening weekend. By the end of its first 30 days, the film had been watched in an estimated 2 million households.

Universal Pictures Home Entertainment released The Boss Baby: Family Business for digital download on August 31, 2021, and on 4K Ultra HD Blu-ray, Blu-ray 3D, Blu-ray and DVD on September 14.

Reception

Box office 
The Boss Baby: Family Business grossed $57.3 million in the United States and Canada, and $89.5 million in other territories, for a worldwide total of $146.8 million.

The film was released with The Forever Purge on July 2, 2021, The Boss Baby: Family Business grossed $7.7 million on its first day, including $1.3 million from Thursday night previews. The film debuted at second grossing $17.3 million from 3,640 theaters. With the top three films at the box office, F9, Family Business, and The Forever Purge, all having been released by Universal, it marked the first time a single studio had done so since February 2005. Its second weekend earnings dropped by 47 percent to $8.7 million, and followed by another $4.7 million the third weekend.

Critical response 
On the review aggregator website Rotten Tomatoes, the film holds an approval rating of 46% based on 102 reviews, with an average rating of 5.30/10. The website's critics consensus reads, "It's more C-level than C-suite, but as a painless diversion for the kids, this Boss Baby manages some decent Family Business." On Metacritic, the film has a weighted average score of 39 out of 100, based on 20 critics, indicating "generally unfavorable reviews". Audiences polled by CinemaScore gave the film an average grade of "A" on an A+ to F scale (an improvement over the first film's "A−"), while PostTrak reported 72% of audience members gave it a positive score, with 49% saying they would definitely recommend it.

Thomas Floyd of The Washington Post gave the film 2.5/4 stars, writing that "...there's a severe case of sequel-itis, as returning director Tom McGrath and screenwriter Michael McCullers go to farcical lengths to re-create the original movie's gags, story beats and character dynamics. Still, Family Business manages to largely improve on its predecessor, with the help of savvy casting and surprisingly pointed social satire." Writing for the Los Angeles Times, Michael Ordoña said: "It's more of the same, for better or worse, but likely with enough bells and whistles — especially those new characters — to please younger fans."

Writing for The A.V. Club, Katie Rife gave the film a "C+" grade and said: "...it's nothing to get worked up about, in part because this Boss Baby moves too quickly to inspire thought about much of anything. Compared to the first film, Family Business moves along at a swift and stimulating clip, with fewer diversions into world-building and hallucinatory internal logic." Carlos Aguilar of the TheWrap wrote: "Family Business offers an array of half-baked conflicts, all crying out to be noticed, while the creators are apparently unsure of which requires the most urgent attention."

Accolades 
The Boss Baby: Family Business received a nomination for the Family Movie of 2021 at the 47th People's Choice Awards. It was nominated for the Kids' Choice Award for Favorite Animated Movie and the Alliance of Women Film Journalists' Time Waster Remake or Sequel Award. At the 2022 Golden Trailer Awards, Family Business "Precious" (Ammo Creative) was nominated for Best Digital: Animation/Family. "Together We Stand" (Barlow and Greenblatt) was nominated at the 12th Hollywood Music in Media Awards for Best Original Song in an Animated Film. The film placed one of the Top Box Office Films at the 2022 ASCAP Awards.

Future
In June 2021, during a Q&A with Alec Baldwin and Amy Sedaris, a third Boss Baby film was announced to be in early development.

References

External links 
 
 
 Official screenplay

2020s American animated films
2020s buddy comedy films
2021 3D films
2021 comedy films
2021 computer-animated films
3D animated films
American 3D films
American adventure comedy films
American buddy comedy films
American children's animated comedy films
American computer-animated films
American sequel films
American spy comedy films
DreamWorks Animation animated films
Films about father–daughter relationships
Films about babies
Animated films about brothers
Films based on children's books
Films directed by Tom McGrath
Films impacted by the COVID-19 pandemic
Films scored by Hans Zimmer
Films set in the 2010s
Films with screenplays by Michael McCullers
Films about rapid human age change
The Boss Baby (franchise)
Universal Pictures animated films
Universal Pictures films
2020s English-language films
4DX films